National Route 320 is a national highway of Japan connecting Sukumo, Kōchi and Kihoku, Ehime in Japan, with a total length of 98.3 km (61.08 mi).

References

National highways in Japan
Roads in Ehime Prefecture
Roads in Kōchi Prefecture